Atka Iceport, also known as Atka Bay, is an iceport about  long and wide, marking a more-or-less permanent indentation in the front of the Ekstrom Ice Shelf on the coast of Queen Maud Land.

Discovery and naming
Atka Iceport was mapped in detail by Norwegian cartographers from surveys and air photographs taken by the Norwegian-British-Swedish Antarctic Expedition (1949-1952), led by John Schjelderup Giæver. It was named by personnel of the USS Atka, under U.S. Navy Commander Glen Jacobsen, which moored here in February 1955 while investigating possible base sites for International Geophysical Year operations.

Station
Atka Bay is the site of Germany's Neumayer-Station III.

Important Bird Area
A 425 ha tract of sea ice in the bay has been identified as an Important Bird Area by BirdLife International because it supports a breeding colony of about 12,000 emperor penguins.

See also
 Ice pier
 Erskine Iceport
 Godel Iceport
 Norsel Iceport
 Bay of Whales

References

External links
 

Important Bird Areas of Antarctica
Penguin colonies
Ports and harbours of Queen Maud Land
Bays of Queen Maud Land